The 2019 Nigerian House of Representatives elections in Kano State was held on February 23, 2019, to elect members of the House of Representatives to represent Kano State, Nigeria.

Overview

Summary

Results

Albasu/Gaya/Ajingi 
A total of 21 candidates registered with the Independent National Electoral Commission to contest in the election. APC candidate Abdullahi Mahmud Gaya won the election, defeating PDP Usman Mohammed Adamu and 19 other party candidates.

Bebeji/Kiru 
A total of 19 candidates registered with the Independent National Electoral Commission to contest in the election. APC candidate Abdulmumin Jibrin won the election, defeating PDP Aliyu Datti Yako and 17 other party candidates. However, the Appeal court sacked the APC candidate Abdulmumin Jibrin and ordered a rerun election. On the day of the rerun, the PDP candidate Aliyu Datti Yako defeated the APC candidate Abdulmumin Jibrin. The PDP candidate Aliyu Datti Yako scored 48,641 votes, while the APC candidate Abdulmumin Jibrin scored 13,507 votes.

Bichi 
A total of 15 candidates registered with the Independent National Electoral Commission to contest in the election. APC candidate Abubakar Abubakar Kabir won the election, defeating PDP Auwalu Muktari and 13 other party candidates.

Dala 
A total of 52 candidates registered with the Independent National Electoral Commission to contest in the election. APC candidate Abdullahi Babangida Alhassan won the election, defeating PDP Suraj Ibrahim Imam and 50 other party candidates.

Danbatta/Makoda 
A total of 19 candidates registered with the Independent National Electoral Commission to contest in the election. APC candidate Ayuba Badamasi won the election, defeating PDP Yusuf Bello Sulaiman and 17 other party candidates.

Doguwa/Tudun Wada 
A total of 2 candidates registered with the Independent National Electoral Commission to contest in the election. APC candidate Alhassan Ado Garba D. won the election, defeating PDP Salisu Yusha'u.

Dawakin Kudu/Warawa 
A total of 5 candidates registered with the Independent National Electoral Commission to contest in the election. APC candidate Mustapha Dawaki won the election, defeating PDP Ali Yahuza Gano and 3 other party candidates.

Dawakin Tofa/Tofa/Rimin Gado 
A total of 19 candidates registered with the Independent National Electoral Commission to contest in the election. APC candidate Jobe Tijjani Abdulkadir won the election, defeating PDP Mannir Dahiru and 17 other party candidates.

Fagge 
A total of 20 candidates registered with the Independent National Electoral Commission to contest in the election. APC candidate Sulaiman Aminu won the election, defeating PDP Ibrahim Jibrin and 18 other party candidates.

Gabasawa/Gezawa 
A total of 24 candidates registered with the Independent National Electoral Commission to contest in the election. APC candidate Nasiru Abduwa Gabasawa won the election, defeating PDP Musa Ado and 22 other party candidates.

Gwarzo/Kabo 
A total of 17 candidates registered with the Independent National Electoral Commission to contest in the election. APC candidate Garo Musa Umar won the election, defeating PDP Nasiru Garo Sule and 15 other party candidates.

Gwale 
A total of 27 candidates registered with the Independent National Electoral Commission to contest in the election. APC candidate Ken-Ken Lawan Abdullahi won the election, defeating PDP Garba Ibrahim Mohammed and 25 other party candidates.

Kumbotso 
A total of 22 candidates registered with the Independent National Electoral Commission to contest in the election. APC candidate Dan Agundi Munir Babba won the election, defeating PDP Ibrahim Umar Balla and 20 other party candidates.

Kano Municipal 
A total of 9 candidates registered with the Independent National Electoral Commission to contest in the election. APC candidate Yakasai Mukhtar Ishaq won the election, defeating PDP Danburam Abubakar Nuhu and 7 other party candidates.

Kunchi/Tsanyawa 
A total of 13 candidates registered with the Independent National Electoral Commission to contest in the election. APC candidate Bala Sani Umar won the election, defeating PDP Abdussalam Adamu and 11 other party candidates.

Karaye/Rogo 
A total of 16 candidates registered with the Independent National Electoral Commission to contest in the election. APC candidate Dederi Haruna Isa won the election, defeating PDP Shehu Usman Aliyu and 14 other party candidates.

Kura/Madobi/Garun Malam 
A total of 15 candidates registered with the Independent National Electoral Commission to contest in the election. APC candidate Idris Kabiru won the election, defeating PDP Muhammad Buhari Sule and 13 other party candidates.

Minjibir/Ungogo 
A total of 54 candidates registered with the Independent National Electoral Commission to contest in the election. APC candidate Sani Ma'aruf Nass won the election, defeating PDP Tajo Usman Zaura and 52 other party candidates.

Nasarawa 
A total of 1 candidate registered with the Independent National Electoral Commission to contest in the election. APC candidate Nassir Ali Ahmad won the election.

Rano/Bunkure/Kibiya 
A total of 42 candidates registered with the Independent National Electoral Commission to contest in the election. APC candidate Kabiru Alhassan Rurum won the election, defeating PDP Sani Muhammad Aliyu and 40 other party candidates.

Sumaila/Takai 
A total of 13 candidates registered with the Independent National Electoral Commission to contest in the election. APC candidate Kawu Suleiman Abdurrahman won the election, defeating PDP Suraja Idris Kanawa and 11 other party candidates.

Shanono/Bagwai 
A total of 3 candidates registered with the Independent National Electoral Commission to contest in the election. APC candidate Badau Yusuf Ahmad won the election, defeating PDP Faruk Muhammad Lawan and 1 other party candidate.

Tarauni 
A total of 28 candidates registered with the Independent National Electoral Commission to contest in the election. APC candidate Ibrahim Hafiz M. Kawu won the election, defeating PDP Nasiru Isa and 26 other party candidates.

Wudil/Garko 
A total of 17 candidates registered with the Independent National Electoral Commission to contest in the election. APC candidate Wudil Muhammad Ali won the election, defeating PDP Ibrahim Yakubu Adamu and 15 other party candidates.

References 

Kano State
Kano State elections